Alaloum is a 1982 Greek comedy film directed by Giorgos Apostolidis, Giannis Smaragdis and Giannis Typaldos, starring Harry Klynn, Manos Destounis and Joly Garbi.

Plot
Finally, the people will split in three groups: Red, Green and Blue (the colors of the major political parties). 
They do not have made it without knowing who brought it by the shipper from the city.

Quotes

Πολύ νόημα, μιλάμε για πολύ νόημα να πούμε  (Poly noima milame yia poli noima na poume = "Much senses, talking for much senses where we say")
As to pistepso (Ας το πιστέψω = As I believe)
"I want to know who I am, my name is Artemi (Θέλω να ξέρω ποιος είμαι, με λένε Αρτέμη = Thelo na xero pios ime, me lene Artemi)

Cast

Harry Klynn ..... multiple characters
Mano Destouni
Joly Garbi ..... Thymokleia
Dimitris Piatas ..... Tasos
Sassa Sofou ..... TV presenter
Nitsa Tsaganea ..... Alkmene
Giorgos Tzifos
Konstantinos Tzoumas ..... political instructor

External links

 

1982 comedy films
1980s Greek-language films
1982 films
Greek comedy films